Reprieve is the 15th studio album by singer-songwriter Ani DiFranco, released on August 8, 2006.

Righteous Babe Records' website notes that only DiFranco's bassist Todd Sickafoose, who had accompanied her on her recent tours, would be performing on the album. The album has a dark, mournful, mellow sound reminiscent of 1999's To the Teeth and 2004's Educated Guess and features experimental arrangements with synthesizers, electronics and tape manipulation.

As the recording of the album was briefly interrupted due to the devastation of Hurricane Katrina, the album has a heavily political and vaguely conceptual undercurrent that "paints a haunting portrait of New Orleans as the water retreats and the natives continue to rebuild their lives."

The album cover was inspired by a picture of a real tree in Nagasaki which was partially destroyed by the atomic bomb. While the city around it lay in ruin, this one tree stood, half of it destroyed, the other untouched. DiFranco also references the eucalyptus tree in the title track about the bombings of Hiroshima and Nagasaki.

While the official release date of Reprieve was August 8, the album was made available for purchase on the iTunes Music Store between June 24 and 27, 2006, possibly in error, as the album date on the site was listed as 2002.

Critical reception

The album so far has a score of 74 out of 100 from Metacritic based on "generally favorable reviews". No Depression gave it a positive review and said of DiFranco: "Her acoustic guitar playing is mesmerizing, as usual, but her melodic fills on electric guitar and keyboards, along with her percussion work, brings some color to this group of songs." Billboard also gave the album a positive review and said it was "more languid than earlier efforts without sacrificing the urgency of [DiFranco's] patented guitar pluck-strum." E! Online gave it a B− and called it "an arresting mix of the singer's political and personal strife set to a jazzy backbeat."

The New York Times gave it an average review and said of DiFranco: "Subtle sounds – acoustic instruments, electronic tones, environmental noises, distorted echoes – well up around her, and they open up pockets of shadow around her usual pinpoint clarity. Now the atmosphere is as important as the words."

Track listing

Personnel 
Ani DiFranco – acoustic guitar, keyboards/synths, programming, samples
Todd Sickafoose – double bass, piano, Wurlitzer, pump organ, trumpet

Production
Ani DiFranco – producer, engineer, artwork, design, mixing
Mike Napolitano – engineer, mixing
Todd Sickafoose – engineer
Brent Lambert – mastering
Brian Grunert – artwork, design
Danny Clinch – photography

Charts
Album

References

External links
 Reprieve at Righteous Babe Records
 

2006 albums
Ani DiFranco albums
Righteous Babe Records albums